Aguilcourt is a commune in the department of Aisne in the Hauts-de-France region of northern France.

The inhabitants of Aguilcourt are known as Aguilcourtois or Aguilcourtoises

Geography
Aguilcourt is 2 km south of the town of Guignicourt.  From Guignicourt the commune can be reached by road D62 which runs from the north-west border of the commune through the village and continues to Orainville in the south-east. Highway D622 runs south-west from the village to Cormicy. The western edge of the commune is traversed by the A26 autoroute (E17) but the nearest exit is Exit 14 north of the commune and west of Guignicourt. Some 200m north-east of the town is the Grand Marais railway station just outside the border of the commune. From here trains run north to Guignicourt and south to Loivre.

The Suippe river forms most of the commune's northeastern border.

Neighbouring communes and villages

Heraldry

Administration

List of Mayors of Aguilcourt

Population

See also
Communes of the Aisne department

References

External links
Aguilcourt on Géoportail, National Geographic Institute (IGN) website 
Aguilcourt on the 1750 Cassini Map

Communes of Aisne